Southeast Tacoma/Johnson Creek is a light rail station and park and ride for the MAX Orange Line. Service began on September 12, 2015.  It is the third stop northbound on the Orange Line. The station was built for residents of the Sellwood and Ardenwald neighborhoods of Portland and Milwaukie. The station is located adjacent to Oregon Route 99E and can be directly accessed by northbound traffic and by traffic from the portion of SE Tenino Street that connects SE Tacoma to SE Johnson Creek Boulevard.

The station is located where the historic Oregon Woolen Mills once operated and in more recent years was the past location of the Goodwill mega-store known as the "Goodwill Bins". Past plans called for the site to be developed as a Wal-Mart and was staunchly opposed by area residents.

Bus service
Line 34 - Linwood/River Rd
Line 99 - Macadam/McLoughlin Express

See also
 Kerf (sculpture), public art installed at the station

References

External links
SE Tacoma/Johnson Creek station (southbound) information from TriMet
SE Tacoma/Johnson Creek station (northbound) information from TriMet
MAX Light Rail Stations – more general TriMet page

2015 establishments in Oregon
MAX Orange Line
MAX Light Rail stations
Railway stations in the United States opened in 2015
Railway stations in Portland, Oregon